The Anarchist Marthas are a Finnish Martha organisation founded in 2007. In addition to the rules of the Martha organisation, its activities are based on some ideals of anarchism. The Anarchist Marthas have operations in Helsinki and Rovaniemi. It had about 130 members in 2011.

References

External links 
Anarkistimartat website

2007 establishments in Finland
Women's organisations based in Finland
Anarchist organizations in Finland